Candida Brush is the Franklin W. Olin Professor of Entrepreneurship at Babson College.

Education 
She graduated from  University of Colorado Boulder, with a BA Spanish and Latin American Studies, Boston College Carroll School of Management, with an MBA Marketing and Entrepreneurship. and Boston University, with a PhD Strategy & Policy. 

She received an Honorary PhD Business & Economics from Jonkoping University, Jonkoping, Sweden.

Publications 
 Nikou, S., Orrensalo, t., Brush, C. S. (2022). Entrepreneurs Information-Seeking Behaviors in the Digital Age: A Systematic Literature Review and a Meta-Analysis. Journal of Small Business Management.
 Brush, C. S., Eddleston, K., Edelman, L., McAdam, M., Rossi-Lamastra, C., Manolova, T. (2022). Catalyzing Change and Innovation in Women's Entrepreneurship- Introduction to the Special Issue. Strategic Entrepreneurship Journal, 16(2), 243-254
 Edited by Séverine Le Loarne – Lemaire, Professor of Strategic Management and Head of the Female Entrepreneurship for a Renewed Economy Research Chair, Grenoble Ecole de Management, France, Candida G. Brush, Franklin W. Olin Distinguished Chair of Entrepreneurship, Babson College, US and Visiting Adjunct, Nord University, Norway and Dublin City University, Ireland, Andrea Calabrò, Professor of Family Business and Entrepreneurship and Adnane Maâlaoui, Professor of Entrepreneurship, IPAG Business School, France (2022) Women, Family and Family Businesses Across Entrepreneurial Contexts. London: Edward Elgar 
 Henry, C. S., Coleman, S., Foss, L., Orser, B., Brush, C. S. (2021). "Richness in Diversity: Towards more Contemporary Research Conceptualizations of Women's Entrepreneurship". International Small Business Journal, 39(7), 609-618
 Balachandra, L., Brush, C. S., Fischer, K. (2021). "Words Matter: Men, Women, and the Power of the Spoken Word in Entrepreneurial Pitching". Journal of Business Venturing Insights, 15
 Edelman, L. F., Manolova, T., Brush, C. S., Chow, C. (2021). "Signal Configurations: Exploring Set- Theoretic Relationships in Angel Investing. Journal of Business Venturing", 23(5), 547-566
 Neck, H. M., Brush, C. S., Greene, P. G. (2021) (Eds.) Teaching Entrepreneurship: A Practice Based Approach, Vol. 2 (pp. 392). Northhampton, MA: Edward Elgar Publishing

References 

Living people
University of Colorado Boulder alumni